Sung Wong Toi is one of the 25 electoral constituencies in the Kowloon City District of Hong Kong which was created in 2015.

The constituency has an estimated population of 20,388 as of 2015.

It is named after Sung Wong Toi. However, as of 2019, the public garden that the rock of Sung Wong Toi was physically located, belongs to Ma Tau Wai constituency, while Sung Wong Toi is the constituency that bordering Ma Tau Wai constituency.

Sung Wong Toi constituency covers part of the Ma Tau Kok, the rest are covered by Ma Hang Chung and Ma Tau Kok constituencies.

Councillors represented

Election results

2010s

References

Constituencies of Hong Kong
Constituencies of Kowloon City District Council
2015 establishments in Hong Kong
Constituencies established in 2015
Ma Tau Chung
Ma Tau Kok